Trifolium willdenovii, the tomcat clover, is a species of plant in the pea family Fabaceae. This species occurs in the western part of North America. As an example occurrence, it is found in the California Coast Ranges in such places as Ring Mountain, California, where it is found in association with cup clover.

References

 C. Michael Hogan. 2008. Ring Mountain, The Megalithic Portal, ed. Andy Burnham 
 John Harry Wiersema and Blanca León. 1999. World Economic Plants: A Standard Reference, Published by CRC Press, 749 pages

External links 

Calflora Database: Trifolium willdenovii (Tomcat clover)
Jepson Manual eFlora (TJM2) treatment of Trifolium willdenovii
UC CalPhotos gallery: Trifolium willdenovii

Burke Herbarium

willdenovii
Flora of California
Flora of British Columbia
Flora of the Northwestern United States
Flora of the Sierra Nevada (United States)
Natural history of the California chaparral and woodlands
Natural history of the California Coast Ranges
Natural history of the Central Valley (California)
Natural history of the San Francisco Bay Area
Flora without expected TNC conservation status